Riggins is an Anglicized form of the Irish surname Ó Riagáin ("son of Riagán") derived from the Irish personal name Riagán, which means "little king".

People
Auntwan Riggins (born 1976), American college baseball coach
Bill Riggins (1900–1943), American baseball player
Charles Riggins (born 1959), American footballer
David Riggins, American murderer and subject of Riggins v. Nevada
John Riggins (born 1949), American football player
Karriem Riggins (born 1975), American jazz drummer
Mark Riggins (born 1957), American baseball coach
Quentin Riggins (born 1966), American player of gridiron football
Reno Riggins 1967), American professional wrestler

Fictional
Tim Riggins, character on Friday Night Lights

See also
Riggins, Idaho
Riggins Lake
Riggins Motel 
Riggins, Mississippi
Battle of Riggins Hill 
Riggins (disambiguation)